200 Po Vstrechnoy (Cyrillic: 200 По Встречной; translation: "200 [km/h] Against the Traffic", pronounced ) is the debut studio album by Russian duo t.A.T.u. It was released by Neformat Records and Universal Music Russia on 21 May 2001 in Russia, Ukraine, and Poland, and was re-released by Universal Music Russia worldwide on 23 June 2003. A re-released version featured new tracks and a new artwork, which was released on 15 February 2002. Created by manager and producer Ivan Shapovalov after the success of members Yulia Volkova and Lena Katina in the band Neposedy, the group managed to sign a deal with Universal Music Russia to produce their first album. It was recorded between 1999 and 2000, and was produced and co-composed by Shapovalov.

Musically, 200 Po Vstrechnoy is an electronic album that incorporates elements of pop rock, and lyrically focuses on themes of love, teenage sex, and lesbianism. Upon its release, the album received mixed reaction from critics and the public; majority of the criticism was aimed at the lyrical content and the image, whilst some highlighted the singles as some of their best work. Commercially, it was a success in Eastern Europe, which sold over one million units as recognised by the International Federation of the Phonographic Industry (IFPI). Three singles were promoted from the album; "Ya Soshla s Uma", "Nas Ne Dogonyat", and "30 Minut". The group commenced their concert tour of the same name as the album in early 2001 and finished in November that same year.

Background and composition
t.A.T.u. members Yulia Volkova and Elena Katina had originally worked for the Russian children musical group Neposedi, but Volkova was dismissed due to volatile behaviour. Katina was also accused by Russian journalism of bad behaviour, and left not long after. Russian music manager Ivan Shapovalov held a casting call for a solo singer to be managed by him, and selected Katina out of several other girls. Him and his ex-wife, Elena Kiper, then decided to create and manage a duo, and selected Volkova as the second act to the group. They signed to their Russian label Neformat Records, and eventually scouted to look for another label; they signed a deal with Universal Music Russia in early 2000. They begun recording the album after finishing the track "Ya Soshla s Uma" in 1999, and finished recording it during mid-2000. The album was produced solely by Shapovalov, whilst the album was composed and written by: Aleksandr Vulikh, Valeriy Polienko, Kiper, Sergio Galoyan, Roman Ryabtsev, Anna Karasyova, and Vadim Stepantsov.

Musically, 200 Po Vstrechnoy is an electronic album that incorporates elements of pop rock. According to Edmond J Coleman and Theo Sandfort, who wrote the book Sexuality and Gender in Postcommunist Eastern Europe and Russia (2005), they noticed that majority of the album's content, particularly "Ya Soshla s Uma" and "Nas Ne Dogonyat", were influenced by techno music; both Coleman and Sandfort believed the sound was influenced by the techno revolution in the late 1990s. The album focuses on themes such as love, teenage sex, and lesbianism.

Release
200 Po Vstrechnoy was released by Neformat and Universal Music Russia in Russia, Ukraine, Czech Republic and Poland regions on 21 May 2001. The album contains nine tracks in both physical and digital formats, with three bonus remixes, and has an cover sleeve that is displays as of a criminal case dossier, with biographies of the girls, fingerprints and partial lyrics in the liner booklet; some versions only issued a four-page booklet. A cassette tape was distributed by Neformat in the Ukraine, which features the nine original tracks but two remixes instead of three. On 15 February 2002, after beginning work on English-language material, Universal Music Russia re-released the album that featured a new track titled "Klouny", and a remix for the songs "30 Minut" and "Malchik-Gey". This version included a new artwork and booklet information with illustrations of a clown that reflected the track "Klouny" ("Klouny" meaning "Clowns" in Russian). After the success of their album 200 km/h in the Wrong Lane in 2002, Universal Music Russia distributed the album in other parts of Europe, Japan and Taiwan on 21 September 2003.

To promote the album, three singles were released. The first single was Ya Soshla S Uma", released on 19 December 2000; the song later gained the English-language version "All The Things She Said". It was a critical success in Europe; In early 2001, Universal Music Group hosted a poll for the audience to vote on which song was the best from 200 Po Vstrechnoy; as a result, "Ya Soshla s Uma" came first place. The single won the MTV Video Music Award for the Russian entry of 2000. In 2001, "Ya Soshla S Uma" won the 100 Pound Hit awarded by Hit FM Russia; they performed the song that same night. As of January 2010, "Ya Soshla s Uma" sold over 50,000 units, and over 200,000 illegal copies. The second single was "Nas Ne Dogonyat", released in 2001. The title of the track was included on the 2006 Russian Dictionary of Modern Quotes (Slovar sovremennykh tsitat). The third and final single was "30 Minut"; it was released as an airplay track, and featured an accompanying music video that was directed by Shapovalov.

Reception
Drago Bonacich from American music publication AllMusic selected "Ya Soshla s Uma", "Nas Ne Dagonyat", and "30 Minut" amongst some of the band's best work. However, the album's critical reviews were generally shaded by the success, yet controversial period of their single "Ya Soshla s Uma", alongside its English version "All The Things She Said"; according to Bonacich, the single was one of the most heavily rotated tracks throughout MTV Europe during its release. The Russian version, prior to the release of "All The Things She Said" at the end of 2002, also received strong attention on MTV throughout the Western world. However, an editor from The Telegraph commented that reviews in Russia were generally favourable and "catapult[ed] the duo to local stardom."

Commercially, 200 Po Vstrechnoy was a success in Eastern Europe. On 22 July 2002, it debuted at number 23 on the Polish Music Charts, one of the highest debuts on that week end. It rose to number 11 the following week, and reached the top ten during its third week. After five weeks, it reached the top spot, making t.A.T.u. the first Russian act to do so. On 14 October, it was certified gold by the Polish Society of the Phonographic Industry (ZPAV) for shipments of 10,000 units; it lasted a total of 39 weeks in the chart, and was certified Platinum by the ZPAV for shipments of 20,000 units. Despite the album not entering any record charts in Japan, it was certified Million by the Recording Industry Association of Japan (RIAJ) for shipments of one million units. It was certified Platinum by the International Federation of the Phonographic Industry (IFPI) for sales of one million units in Europe, making t.A.T.u. the first group to achieve a Platinum certification on two separate bilingual language albums; the other being the English language adaption 200 km/h in the Wrong Lane (2002). They also received the distinction to be the first Eastern European act to achieve a Platinum award; both Volkova and Katina attended the awarding in Moscow, Russia.

In Russia, there were no prominent music charts at the time of the album's release; despite this, it sold 500,000 units inside a two-month period. By the end of the 2001, it sold approximately 850,000 units, which was described by an editor at The Telegraph as "an astonishing number in a country where piracy is estimated to account for some 95 per cent of all sales...". As of August 2016, the album has sold over one million copies in Russia, and has been illegally purchased more than four million units, making it the group's highest selling Russian-language album and one of the highest selling albums in that region.

Promotion
To promote the album, t.A.T.u. commenced their Russian concert tour that used the album's title as its official promotional campaign. The girls prepared in 2000 where they wanted the choreography "precise", to a point where one segment featured the girls stripping off their clothes; this was scrapped from the original plan. The group performed all over Russia and visited the Ukraine, all between February to November 2001. After the re-release of the album, the group extended the tour in regions such as Germany, Czech Republic, and Poland, amongst other destinations. In July 2015, the group uploaded an official unreleased teaser of their single "Ya Soshla s Uma" to their YouTube channel to commemorate the singles 15th anniversary; with its release date on 19 December, it remained unreleased. However, between June–August 2016, the group uploaded unreleased footage and remixed versions of their singles "Ya Soshla s Uma", "Nas Ne Dogoynat", and "30 Minut".

Track listing

Credits and personnel
Credits adapted from the CD liner notes of 200 Po Vstrechnoy;

Recording
 Mixed and recorded at Neformat Studios by Ivan Shapovalov and Sergio Galoyan in Moscow, Russia.

Personnel

 Yulia Volkova – vocals
 Elena Katina – vocals
 Eugene Kuritsyn – arrangement
 Ivan Shapovalov – producer, music video director, composing, songwriting
 Aleksandr Vulikh – songwriting
 Valeriy Polienko – songwriting, composing

 Elena Kiper – songwriting, composing
 Roman Ryabtsev – songwriting, composing
 Anna Karasyova – songwriting
 Vadim Stepantsov – songwriting
 Neformat – management, record label
 Universal Music Russia – management, record label

Charts

Weekly charts

Year-end charts

Certifications and sales

Release history

References

External links
History at t.A.T.u.'s official website. 

T.A.T.u. albums
2001 debut albums
Interscope Records albums
Russian-language albums
Albums produced by Ivan Shapovalov
LGBT-related albums